Honeycomb is a 2022 Canadian horror film directed and co-written by Avalon Fast in her feature directorial debut. It stars Rowan Wales, Sophie Bawks-Smith, Jillian Frank, Destini Stewart and Mari Geraghty.

It premiered virtually at the Slamdance Film Festival on 27 January 2022, and had its Canadian premiere at the 2022 Fantasia Film Festival.

Cast
 Rowan Wales as Millie
 Sophie Bawks-Smith as Willow
 Jillian Frank as Jules
 Destini Stewart as Leader
 Mari Geraghty as Vicky

Production
Filming took place during 2019 on Cortes Island, British Columbia, Canada.

Reception

Critical response 
On Rotten Tomatoes, the film holds an approval rating of 87% based on 15 reviews, with an average rating of 6.30/10.

References

External links
 

2022 horror films
Canadian horror films
Films shot in British Columbia
2022 directorial debut films
2020s English-language films
2020s Canadian films